{{DISPLAYTITLE:C29H48O}}
The molecular formula C29H48O (molar mass: 412.69 g/mol) may refer to:

 Avenasterol, a sterol
 Chondrillasterol, a sterol
 Clerosterol, a sterol
 7-Dehydrositosterol, a sterol
 Fucosterol, an algal sterol
 Isofucosterol, an algal sterol
 24-Methylenelophenol, a sterol
 4α-Methylfecosterol, a sterol
 Norcycloartenol, a phytosterol
 29-Norlanosterol, a sterol
 Spinasterol, a phytosterol
 Stigmasterol, an unsaturated plant sterol
 Vitamin D5, a form of vitamin D